Benjamin Roberson (12 September 1832 – 6 April 1874) was an English first-class cricketer active from 1865 to 1876 who played for Middlesex. He was born in Ware, Hertfordshire and died in Upper Holloway. A wicketkeeper, he played in two first-class matches.

References

English cricketers
Middlesex cricketers
1832 births
1874 deaths
People from Ware, Hertfordshire